Jonathan Percy Starker Saxe (born March 23, 1993), known professionally as JP Saxe, is a Canadian musician and singer. He is best known for his collaboration with American singer and his now ex-girlfriend Julia Michaels titled "If the World Was Ending" which was released in 2019. The song was nominated for a 2021 Grammy. His "hero" grandfather, noted cellist János Starker, was a multiple nominee and Grammy winner.

Career

2017–2018: Both Can Be True: Part 1 
Between April 2017 and March 2018, JP Saxe released the singles, "Changed", "Anybody Else" and "The Few Things". In November 2018, he released "25 in Barcelona" as the lead single from his debut EP. He released his debut EP, Both Can Be True: Part 1, on November 8, 2018.

2019–present: Hold It Together 
He released the singles "Same Room" and "Women Who Look Like You" between June and August 2019. He released "If the World Was Ending" as the lead single from his second EP. He released "Sad Corny Fuck" as the second single from his second EP, in February 2020. He released his second EP, Hold It Together, on February 7, 2020. It peaked at number 53 on the Canadian Albums Chart. He features on Lennon Stella's single "Golf on TV".

In April 2020, JP Saxe and Julia Michaels re-released "If the World Was Ending" with other artists including Sam Smith, H.E.R., Alessia Cara, Sabrina Carpenter, Niall Horan, Keith Urban and Finneas O'Connell, who produced the song. Each artist filmed their part on their phones from their homes while self-isolating and features on the music video. Saxe explained that the collaboration was inspired by covers of the song he saw online, and he then texted the featured artists to ask if they'd want to get involved. All proceeds benefit Doctors Without Borders, where one of Saxe's friends worked, and the video ends with a special message from a participating doctor about the impact of COVID-19 on countries where many of the doctors are stationed. In a statement, Saxe and Michaels said, "We are so grateful for the incredible work being done by those on the frontlines during this global pandemic. At a time when it can sometimes feel like 'the world is ending', we thank all of the healthcare workers, first responders, and essential workers who are helping so many people in need. Please stay home, stay safe (and don't actually go over!)"

His song "Same Room" was shortlisted for the 2020 SOCAN Songwriting Prize.

In 2023, he participated in an all-star recording of Serena Ryder's single "What I Wouldn't Do", which was released as a charity single to benefit Kids Help Phone's Feel Out Loud campaign for youth mental health.

Discography

Studio albums

Extended plays

Singles

As lead artist

As featured artist

Songwriting credits

Notes

References

External links 
Official website

Living people
Canadian pop singers
1994 births
Canadian male singers
Musicians from Toronto
Juno Award for Breakthrough Artist of the Year winners